Peter Ibbetson is a play based on George du Maurier's 1891 novel of the same name.  It debuted in the United States in 1917.

History
The play was written by John N. Raphael, a London newspaper correspondent, who had written the adaptation of the novel twenty years prior, and showed his work to actress Constance Collier, who was eager to bring it to America.  

Raphael's play was actually first performed at a single London matinee show on June 23, 1915, as a benefit for a World War I charity held at His Majesty's Theatre.  The actors donated their services, including Owen Nares playing the title role and Henry Ainley as Colonel Ibbetson.

The play debuted in the United States at the Republic Theatre in New York on April 18, 1917.  The cast featured John Barrymore, Lionel Barrymore, Constance Collier and Laura Hope Crews.  It ran for 71 performances into June 1917, and then re-opened  in August.  The play toured into May 1918. 

In London, the play debuted for a proper run at the Savoy Theatre on February 6, 1920, transferred to the Court in April, and ran for a total of 106 performances. Basil Rathbone played the title role.

The play was revived on Broadway for 31 performances in April-May 1931 at the Shubert Theatre.

Original New York cast

Peter Ibbetson ... John Barrymore
Colonel Ibbetson ... Lionel Barrymore
Major Duquesois ... Wallis Clark
Mr. Liston ... Montague Weston
Raphard Merrydew ... Leo Stark
Crockett ... Eric Hudson
The Bishop ... Alexander Loftus
Charlie Plunket ... Cecil Clovelly
Achille Grigoux ... Benjamin Kauser
The Prison Chaplain ... Lowden Adams
Mary, Duchess of Towers ... Constance Collier
Mrs. Dean ... Laura Hope Crews
Mrs. Glyn ... Alice Wilson
Madge Plunket ... Catherine Charlton
Lady Diana Vivash ... Barbara Allen
Victorine ... Martha Noel
A Sister of Charity ... Nina Varesa

Adaptations

Peter Ibbetson was adapted for the September 10, 1939, presentation of the CBS Radio series The Campbell Playhouse. The hour-long adaptation starred Orson Welles (Peter Ibbetson), Helen Hayes (Mary, Duchess of Towers), John Emery (Colonel Ibbetson), Agnes Moorehead (Mrs. Deane), Vera Allen (Madame Seraskier), Everett Sloane (Crockett), Eustace Wyatt (Warden),  Ray Collins (Governor), George Coulouris (Chaplain), Edgar Barrier (Judge), Richard Wilson (Turnkey), Kingsley Colton (Peter as a child) and Betty Philson (Mary as a child).

References

External links

 

Broadway plays
1917 plays